Statistics of Division 2 in the 1979/1980 season.

Overview
It was contested by 36 teams, and Tours and Auxerre won the championship.

League tables

Group A

Group B

Championship play-offs

|}

Promotion play-offs

|}
Avignon was qualified to the play-off against 18th placed team of Division 1, Lyon.

References
France - List of final tables (RSSSF)

Ligue 2 seasons
French
2